World Gardens is an album by jazz pianist Roberto Magris released on the JMood label in 2018, featuring performances by Magris with his trio from Kansas City.

Reception

The All About Jazz review by Dan McClenaghan awarded the album 4 stars and called its content "a variety of beautiful musical flowers", while the  more subdued All About Jazz review by Jerome Wilson awarded the album 3 ½ stars and noted it as "a fine representation of the scope and joy of (Magris's) piano abilities."

Track listing
 Never Can Say Goodbye (Clifton Davis) - 6:20 
 Pilgrim (Lackner/Nievergelt/Perkins) - 7:50 
 Blue Bamboo (Yunnan folk song) - 9:12 
 Another More Blues (Roberto Magris) - 5:13 
 Song for an African Child  (Roberto Magris) - 7:56 
 Blues at Lunch! (Roberto Magris) - 7:49 
 Vse Najlepse Rozice / All the Most Beautiful Flowers (Slovenia folk song) - 4:02 
 High Priest (Andrew Cyrille) - 6:23 
 I’m Glad There is You (Jimmy Dorsey/Paul Madeira) - 9:19 
 Stella by Starlight (Victor Young) - 9:32 
 Audio Notebook - 2:59

Personnel

Musicians
Roberto Magris - piano
Dominique Sanders - bass
Brian Steever - drums
Pablo Sanhueza - congas and percussion

Production
 Paul Collins – executive producer and producer
 George Hunt and Robert Rebeck – engineering
Abe Goldstien – design
Giovanna Bissoli – painting
 Jerry Lockett – photography

References

Roberto Magris albums
2018 albums